Simshar can refer to:

 Simshar incident, a ship explosion incident off the eastern coast of Malta
 Simshar (film), a 2014 Maltese film based on the above